Theatrum Pictorium, or Theatre of Painting, is a short-hand name of a book published in the 1660s by David Teniers the Younger for his employer, the Archduke Leopold Wilhelm of Austria. It catalogs 243 Italian paintings in the Archduke's collection of over 1300 paintings. The paintings are reproduced by engravings made by various engravers after reduced-size copies (modelli) created by Teniers. David Teniers' brother Abraham Teniers was involved in organizing the publication of the work. A second edition with page numbers was published in 1673.

Background
During the years 1646-1656 when he was stationed in Brussels as governor of the Habsburg Netherlands, Archduke Leopold Wilhelm assembled one of the greatest art collections of his age. Teniers effectively became its curator after Jan van den Hoecke, a court painter and curator of the collection in Brussels died in 1651. The collection included works by Hans Holbein the Elder, Pieter Bruegel the Elder, Jan van Eyck, Raphael, Giorgione, Paolo Veronese and more than 15 works by Titian.

Before moving back to Vienna in 1656, Archduke Leopold Wilhelm kept his art collection in his palace in Brussels. Teniers depicted the galleries in which the collection was displayed in various compositions which are now spread across various collections.

At the end of his governorship in 1656, the Archduke and his collection relocated to the Stallburg. This archducal collection now forms the heart of Vienna's Kunsthistorisches Museum.

Scope of the project
During his tenure as keeper of Archduke Leopold Wilhelm's collection, Teniers undertook the preparation and publication of the first ever illustrated catalog of old master paintings. His brother Abraham Teniers was involved in organizing the publication of the work. The first official publication of the work in bound book format was published by Hendrick Aertssens in Brussels in 1660 (although the title page states the date as 1658).

The title page of the book refers to it as 'Hoc Amphiteatrum Picturarum' ('This amphitheatre of pictures'). The publication is now often referred to as Theatrum pictorium ('Theatre of Paintings'). The cover of the Theatrum pictorium shows a bust portrait of the Archduke with a dedication to the Archduke as well as introductions in Latin, French, Spanish and Dutch.  The title page clarifies that Teniers funded the publication project out of his own pocket. The Theatrum pictorium was published in four languages (Latin, French, Dutch, and Spanish) and further editions appeared in 1673 and 1688 and in the 18th century.  The last edition was published in 1755.

Execution of the project

In the preparation of this project, Teniers first painted reduced modelli after the original works on panels of roughly 17 by 25 cm in dimensions.  Of these modelli, 120 were auctioned off as part of the estate of John Spencer-Churchill, 7th Duke of Marlborough in 1886. The modelli are now spread among various collections. The Courtauld Institute of Art Gallery holds 14 of these works, the largest group in any public collection. These were then engraved on the same scale by a pool of 12 engravers. The principal engravers were: Jan van Troyen, Lucas Vorsterman II, Pieter van Lisebetten, Coryn Boel, Theodor van Kessel. Other engravers included Jan van Ossenbeeck, Franciscus van der Steen, Nikolaus van Hoy, Remoldus Eynhoudt, Coenraad Lauwers, Dominicus Claessens and Jan Popels.

Teniers used full colour in the modelli, rather than grisaille.  This could mean that he intended these reproductions to function as independent records of some of these Italian paintings in the Archduke's collection.  From the many modelli, which have been preserved, it is obvious that Teniers's copies constitute a true record of the originals even while he left out details and painted them in his typical fluid and transparent manner. The engraving of the catalog by engravers who worked after the modelli, not the originals, was started by 1656. In the 17th century there existed no efficient method for inverting images.  As a result, most of the prints in the catalog are reverse images of the originals. Each print gives the name of the author of the original work on the left hand side (indicated by the letter 'p' for 'pinxit', Latin for 'painted by') and the engraver of the print on the right hand side (indicated by the letter 's' for 'sculpsit', Latin for 'engraved by').  Some editions also indicated the original dimensions of the paintings.

Selection of works
The publication comprised 243 engravings of important Italian paintings in the art collection of Archduke Leopold Wilhelm.  While the project was initially planned to include the entire collection of the Archduke, the Archduke returned to Vienna before the project was completed.  As a result, ultimately only a series of 246 plates was produced, of which 243 depicted about half of the Italian paintings then owned by the Archduke).

Teniers made a list of the painters in the collection as part of the forward to his 1673 catalog:

Of all the painters, Michaelina Wautier (who was not an Italian painter) and Madonna Fitta de Milano are the only women whose work is documented in the Archduke's collection.

Teniers's modelli and the Theatrum pictorium serve as a record for some important paintings the whereabouts of which are currently unknown. For instance, the modelli in the Metropolitan Museum of Art of the Old Age in Search of Youth attributed by Teniers to Correggio and the Adam and Eve after Padovanino are the most important records of these lost paintings.

The Theatrum Pictorium had an important impact on the manner in which collections were organised, appreciated and published and continued to be used as a reference book during the 18th century.

Surviving works
The works listed in the Theatrum pictorium that survive are generally in the Kunsthistorisches Museum, while the modelli or small models for the engravings have been lost or are in other collections. The engravings and the modelli were inscribed with the dimensions of the original paintings, though their characteristics were often adjusted to take advantage of the maximum illustration possibilities of the album page size. The dimensions were in the form "4 alta 3 lata", which means 4 palm-widths high and 3 palm-widths wide, such as the case with the engraving after Bassano's Boy with a Flute:

List of engravings (matched to painting or modello)

References

External links
 
 Complete set of images from the 1660s version with associated metadata listing titles (not in the 1673 book), original artist names (note that the engravings reflect the period attributions by Teniers, while some paintings have since been reattributed), page numbers, and engravers in the Slovak National Gallery
 Copy of the 1673 book in the Getty Research Institute on archive.org
 Le Grand Cabinet Des Tableaux De L'Archi-Duc Leopold-Guillaume &c. &c. &c., record for a later version published in Amsterdam and Leipzig by Arkstée & Merkus, 1755
 Information about an exhibition about this book called David Teniers’s Theatrum Pictorium and the John G. Johnson Collection, June 12, 2010 - January 2011, at the Philadelphia Museum of Art

1673 books
Visual arts exhibitions
Art collections in the Netherlands
Art collections in Germany
Paintings in the collection of the Archduke Leopold Wilhelm of Austria
Catalogues
David Teniers the Younger